Tablas Creek Vineyard is a California wine estate producing various Rhône-style blends and varietal wine. The winery is located in the Adelaida district west of Paso Robles in the Santa Lucia Mountains, within the Paso Robles AVA. It is an exemplar of the GSM blend (Southern Rhône), and has been influential in popularizing it in California.

History

Described as the sibling winery of southern Rhône estate Château de Beaucastel in Châteauneuf du Pape, Tablas Creek Vineyard was founded in 1990 by Jean-Pierre and François Perrin of the Perrin family, proprietors of Beaucastel since the early 20th century, and Robert Haas, an importer and the founder of Vineyard Brands. Having searched for the appropriate terroir since 1985, in 1989 the Perrins and Haas chose the site, a former alfalfa farm on top of a Late Cretaceous seabed, for its soil pH and limestone base similarities to Beaucastel.

With an aim to produce Rhône-style wines made by organic principles, vines were imported from the Beaucastel vineyards, both to supply varieties previously unavailable in California such as Counoise and Grenache blanc, and in order to ensure the disease-free provenance of the remaining varieties. Beginning in 1990, the vines were quarantined by the United States Department of Agriculture. The first clones were released in 1992, with additional clones released over the next two decades.  Planting of these French clones began in 1994. Previously, experiments had been made with American material planted in selected soils beginning in 1992. Wines were produced under the names Adelaida Hills and Tablas Hills between 1994 and 1996, with the first Tablas Creek Vineyard wines produced in 1997. Although all grapes were grown on site, the launch of the Tablas Creek Vineyard label was delayed until the majority of the wine was produced from French vines.

Pierre Perrin estimates that the Tablas Creek estate with its nursery project has "probably been one of the most expensive vineyards in the world to develop". In 2009 it was reported that 50% of the sales of the Tablas Creek production takes place at the estate or through their wine club.

Production

The estate annually produces ca.  of wine.

Esprit de Beaucastel
The signature wines of Tablas Creek are the red Esprit de Beaucastel and white Esprit de Beaucastel Blanc made with an objective for aging. Esprit de Beaucastel is largely based on Mourvèdre, with additions of Grenache, Syrah and Counoise. Esprit de Beaucastel Blanc is based on Roussanne with additions of Grenache blanc and Picpoul blanc.

Côtes de Tablas
The Côtes de Tablas wines are produced to be consumed young. The red Côtes de Tablas is a blend of four grape varieties Grenache, Syrah, Counoise and Mourvèdre. The white Côtes de Tablas Blanc is a blend of Viognier, Roussanne, Marsanne and Grenache blanc.

Patelin de Tablas
The Patelin de Tablas wines debuted with the 2010 vintage, and include some Tablas Creek fruit and fruit purchased from other Paso Robles vineyards.  The Patelin de Tablas red is a blend based on Syrah, with Grenache, Mourvedre and Counoise. It's good with appetizers.  The Patelin de Tablas Blanc is a blend of Grenache blanc, Viognier, Roussanne, and Marsanne.

Panoplie
A low-production cuvée made only in exceptional years, with a production profile similar to the Beaucastel wine "Hommage á Jacques Perrin", Panoplie consists of Mourvèdre blended with portions of Grenache and Syrah.

Antithesis
Apart from the line of Rhône-style wines, the Anthisesis is a low-production 100% Chardonnay made from a Burgundian clone named La Vineuse.

Varietal wines
Tablas Creek produces a wide range of varietal labeled wines including Roussanne, Grenache blanc, Syrah, Grenache, Mourvèdre, Picpoul blanc, Counoise, Viognier, Bergeron, Vermentino and Tannat.

Rosé
The Tablas Creek Rosé is made from Mourvèdre with additions of Grenache and Counoise.

Dessert wines
These consist of a Vin de Paille blended from Grenache blanc, Viognier, Roussanne, and Marsanne, a Vin de Paille titled "Quintessence" made from Roussanne, and a Vin de Paille titled "Sacrerouge" made from Mourvèdre.

Glenrose Vineyard
Made only in 2002 vintage, from a single vineyard plot situated at above , the cuvée consists of Syrah, Mourvèdre, Grenache, Counoise.

Nursery

Since the 1990 program to propagate grape vine clones from the Beaucastel vineyards, followed by the three-year U.S. Department of Agriculture quarantine, the vine nursery was finally established in 1992. Between 1993 and 2003, the estate produced over 1,000,000 vine grafts on site, and the sale of plant cuttings to other wine producers remains a part of Tablas Creek's business, although since 2004 Tablas Creek has contracted with NovaVine Nursery in Santa Rosa, California to produce and market their vine material.

The cloned grape varieties cultivated in the nursery available for purchase include classic Rhône grape varieties – Mourvèdre, Syrah, Grenache, Counoise, Roussanne, Viognier, Grenache blanc, Marsanne, Picpoul blanc – as well as Vermentino and Tannat.

References

External links
 Tablas Creek Vineyard official website
 Tablas Creek Vineyard blog

Wineries in San Luis Obispo County
Companies based in San Luis Obispo County, California
Buildings and structures in Paso Robles, California
Paso Robles, California
Santa Lucia Range
1997 establishments in California